The phrase "fatherland and freedom" or "fatherland and liberty" may refer to
 Basque Country and Freedom, a Basque separatist group better known as ETA
 For Fatherland and Freedom/LNNK, a Latvian political party
 Fatherland and Liberty ("Patria y Libertad"), an extreme right political movement in Chile
 Fatherland and Liberty, a play written by José Martí
 Vatan ve Hürriyet (meaning "Motherland and Liberty" in Turkish) a secret society under Ottoman Empire.